Wo Jia or Qiang Jia, personal name Zi Yu, was a Shang dynasty King of China.

In the Records of the Grand Historian he was listed by Sima Qian as the fifteenth Shang king, succeeding his brother Zu Xin. He was enthroned in the year of Renyan with Bi as his capital. He ruled for about 25 years (although other sources claim  20 years) before his death. He was given the posthumous name Wo Jia and was succeeded by his nephew Zu Ding.

Oracle script inscriptions on bones unearthed at Yinxu alternatively record that he was the fourteenth Shang king, given the posthumous name Qiang Jia.

References

Shang dynasty kings